Vrbo operates an online marketplace for vacation rentals. It was originally known as Vacation Rentals by Owner or VRBO. It is headquartered in Austin, Texas, and is owned by Expedia Group.

History
The VRBO website was created by David Clouse, a retired teacher, in 1995 in Aurora, Colorado with the goal of renting his Breckenridge Ski Resort condo. The website soon became popular with homeowners that wanted to list their properties for short term rental.

By 2006, Vrbo had over 65,000 rental listings and was adding 100 new listings per day.

Vrbo originally had a subscription business model in which payment of an annual fee allowed homeowners to list their properties on the website. 

In 2006, Vrbo was acquired by HomeAway.

In late 2015, Expedia Group acquired HomeAway, including Vrbo.

In March 2019, VRBO was re-branded Vrbo, including a new logo, capitalization, and pronunciation.

In May 2019, the HomeAway and Vrbo websites were both rebranded as Vrbo.

Criticism

Strict refund policy during the COVID-19 pandemic
During the COVID-19 pandemic, Airbnb and Tripadvisor forced property owners to offer full refunds to travelers that were impacted by the COVID-19 lockdowns. However, Vrbo did not mandate that hosts offer refunds to guests, leaving it up to guests and hosts to work out the details of any refunds. This prompted calls on Twitter to boycott Vrbo. Vrbo also prohibited hosts from downplaying the COVID-19 pandemic in refund negotiations with guests.

Collaboration with Chrissy Teigen
In May 2021, Vrbo received backlash after publishing a three-and-a-half-minute long video featuring Chrissy Teigen and her husband John Legend in which they gush over their vacation rental booked on Vrbo. Teigen had been accused by Courtney Stodden and others of cyberbullying.

Lack of backing of guarantee
The company has been accused of not complying with its "book with confidence" guarantee. In one case, a customer claims to have lost £6,000 after the property owner of a rental property in Ibiza booked on Vrbo "disappeared".

Hidden cameras in property bedrooms
The company is the subject of several lawsuits after customers renting properties using the platform have found hidden cameras in private areas of properties, including in bedrooms. Police have also found images of guests undressed on the computers of such homeowners.

Non-compliance with rental laws
In March 2022, Vrbo was sued by the city of Los Angeles for not complying with rental laws, including allowing hosts to profit from the platform without registering under the city's short-term rental ordinance, as required. City Attorney Mike Feuer claimed that 29% of bookings made in a recent 30-day period appeared to violate the city's rules.

References

External links 

American companies established in 1995
American travel websites
Expedia Group
Hospitality companies established in 1995
Internet properties established in 1995
Online marketplaces of the United States
Real estate companies established in 1995
Real estate services companies of the United States
Sharing economy
Vacation rental